Campanula lazica is a species of flowering plant in the bellflower family, Campanulaceae. It is endemic to northeast Anatolia, Turkey.

Description
This species can be found in rocky areas at elevations between 1200–1800 m. It is estimated to occupy an area of 9 km2.

Conservation
It is listed as critically endangered by the IUCN. Human disturbance, soil erosion and livestock grazing all pose a serious threat to the Campanula lazica. Its habitat lies within a national park.

References

lazica
Flora of Turkey
Taxa named by Benjamin Balansa
Taxa named by Pierre Edmond Boissier